Blechnidium is a genus of ferns in the family Blechnaceae, subfamily Blechnoideae, with a single species Blechnidium melanopus, according to the Pteridophyte Phylogeny Group classification of 2016 (PPG I). The genus is accepted in a 2016 classification of the family Blechnaceae, but other sources sink it into a very broadly defined Blechnum, equivalent to the whole of the PPG I subfamily.

References

Blechnaceae
Monotypic fern genera